The Church of Most Holy Saviour (Italian: Chiesa del Santissimo Salvatore) is a Baroque-style, Roman Catholic church located on #396 of the ancient main street of the Palermo, the Cassaro, presently Via Vittorio Emanuele, in the ancient quarter of the Albergaria of the city of Palermo, region of Sicily, Italy.

History

This site for the present church was formerly the location of a Basilian monastery and church dedicated to the Saviour, founded in 1072 by the Norman Robert Guiscard. The church and monastery continued having royal patronage under the Swabian rule. It was said that Constance, Queen of Sicily (1154-1198) had been confined to the church as a nun since childhood, due to the prediction that "her marriage would destroy Sicily" before 30, when she was eventually engaged for political reasons. In 1501, the monastery was converted to the Latin Rite. 

In 1528, a new church was rebuilt with three naves; it was repositioned in an opposite orientation to the former building. In 1682, the present layout was designed by Paolo Amato (architect), who was helped by the Jesuit Angelo Italia. Construction proceeded until a formal inauguration in 1700 and consecration in 1704. Much of the interior decoration was added during the 18th century. The Earthquake of Terrasini in 1726, caused much damage to the church, including the loss of the main altar designed by Giacomo Amato and Gaetano Lazzara. This led to a further reinforcement of the large dome in 1763 under the direction of Vincenzo Giovenco. The cupola interior was frescoed by Vito D'Anna, who painted a Glory of St Basil (now fragmentary). Further decoration included the pavements of the Chapels of St Basil (left) and Santa Rosalia (right). The pavement of the main was designed in 1856 by Giuseppe Patricolo. 

In 1943, the allied bombardment of the city, devastated the interior of the church. Many of the paintings in the church were destroyed. The present building is only the result of a major restoration, utilizing when possible the remnants of the former decoration. The building plan is an elongated twelve-dimensional dodecagon, circumscribed by an ellipse whose major axis is from the middle of the entrance. The walls of the church are richly decorated with precious Sicilian polychrome marbles by the master Salvatore Allegra and, above, the dome ceiling is decorated with the stuccoes by the master Francesco Alaimo.

Inside there are three chapels, the largest one is dominated by a small dome frescoed by Filippo Tancredi. The frescoes on the walls of the entrance staircase depict the Miracle of the Healing of the Child by St Basil and St Basil preaching painted by Vito D'Anna. In the apse is a large marble group representing the Crucified Christ between the Archangel Michael, San Gaetano and Santa Maria Maddalena. The canvas that overlooks the present presbytery area depicts the Coronation of Santa Rosalia (1725) by Cedri, formerly  housed in the Benedictine Monastery of Santa Rosalia, which was razed in the 20th century to expand Via Roma.

References

External links 

 Gaspare Palermo, Guida istruttiva per potersi conoscere tutte le magnificenze della Città di Palermo, Volume III, Palermo, Reale Stamperia, 1816

Salvatore
Baroque architecture in Palermo
17th-century Roman Catholic church buildings in Italy